Creech may refer to:

 Creech, Arkansas, United States
 Creech, Kentucky, United States
 Creech Air Force Base, a United States Air Force base in Nevada
 Creech Grange, Steeple, Dorset, England
 Creech St Michael, Somerset, England
 The Creech, a comic book series

People with the name Creech 
 Billy J. Creech (born 1943), American politician
 Don Creech (born 1948), American actor 
 Papa John Creach (1917–1994), American musician
 Sharon Creech (born 1945), American writer 
 Thomas Creech (1659–1700), English translator of classical works
 Thomas Eugene Creech (born 1950), American serial killer on Idaho's death row
 Wilbur L. Creech (1927–2003), United States Air Force commander
 William Creech (1745–1815), Scottish publisher, printer, bookseller and politician
 Wyatt Creech (born 1946), former New Zealand politician